Kellan, also spelt Kellen, is a male given name. Other variations of Kellen or Kellan include Kaelan, Kallen, Keelan, Keilan, Keillan, Kelan, Kelden, Kelle, Kellyn, and Kellin.

People 
People with Kellen as a first name include:
Kellen Briggs (born 1983), American hockey player
Kellen Clemens (born 1983), American football player
Kellen Damico (born 1989), American tennis player
Kellen Davis (born 1985), American football player
Kellen Diesch (born 2000), American football player
Kellen Mond (born 1999), American football player
Kellen Moore (born 1989), American football player
Kellen Winslow (born 1957), American football player
Kellen Winslow II (born 1983), American football player
Kellen Goff (born 1995), American voice actor
Kellen Brown (born 1996), British Designer

People with Kellan as a first name include:
Kellan Grady (born 1997), American basketball player
Kellan Lutz (born 1985), American actor
Kellan Quick (born 1983), American football player

People with Kellen as a surname include:
Konrad Kellen (1913–2007), German-born, naturalized American citizen, intelligence analyst

People with Kellin as a first name include:
Kellin Quinn (born 1986), lead singer of American post-hardcore band Sleeping With Sirens

Fiction
 Kellen Tavadon, fictional character in The Obsidian Trilogy novels
 Kellin, alien in Star Trek: Voyager episode "Unforgettable"
 Lucas Kellan, protagonist and player character in Killzone: Shadow Fall video game
Father Kellan Ashby, character in the TV series Sons of Anarchy

See also
 Kallen
 Kylen

English-language masculine given names